David Farrar may refer to:

 David Farrar (actor) (1908–1995), English actor
 David Farrar (basketball) (born c. 1947), American college basketball coach
 David Farrar (blogger) (born 1967), political activist, blogger and pollster in New Zealand
 Dave Farrar, British broadcaster
 David H. Farrar, academic and university administrator
 David J. Farrar (born 1921), English engineer